Bakalar is a surname. Notable people with the surname include:

A. M. Bakalar, Polish writer
David Bakalar, physicist, semiconductor engineer, businessman, and sculptor
Elsa Bakalar (1919–2010), English-born American garden designer
Jeff Bakalar (born 1982), American podcaster

See also
Bakalar Air Force Base, a former United States Air Force base in Indiana